Richard Boyle may refer to:

Nobility
Richard Boyle, 1st Earl of Cork (1566–1643), Lord High Treasurer of Ireland
Richard Boyle, 1st Earl of Burlington (1612–1698), and 2nd Earl of Cork, Lord High Treasurer of Ireland and a cavalier
Richard Boyle, 2nd Viscount Shannon (1675–1740), British military officer and statesman
Richard Boyle, 3rd Earl of Burlington (1694–1753), and 4th Earl of Cork
Richard Boyle, 2nd Earl of Shannon (1727–1807), Irish peer and Member of Parliament
Richard Boyle, 4th Earl of Shannon (1809–1868), British politician
Richard Boyle, 9th Earl of Cork (1829–1904), British politician
Richard Boyle, 6th Earl of Shannon (1860–1906), politician in Canada's Northwest Territories

Sports
Richard Boyle (canoeist) (born 1961), New Zealand sprint canoeist
Richard Boyle (rowing) (1888–1953), British rowing coxswain; medallist at the 1908 Summer Olympics
Dickie Boyle (1869–?), Scottish professional footballer for Everton
Dick Boyle (American football), American football player and coach

Others
Richard Boyle (archbishop of Tuam) (c. 1574–1644), Archbishop of Tuam
Richard Boyle (soldier) (died 1649), Anglo-Irish Royalist officer
Richard Boyle (MP, died 1665), MP for County Cork
Richard Boyle (bishop of Ferns and Leighlin) (died 1682), Anglican bishop
Richard Boyle (MP, died 1711), MP for Old Leighlin
Richard Vicars Boyle (1822–1908), Irish civil engineer
Richard Boyle (journalist) (1942–2016), American screenwriter and protagonist for the 1986 film Salvador
Richard Boyle (astronomer) (born 1943), astronomer at the Vatican Observatory

See also
Boyle (disambiguation)